Che with descender (Ҷ ҷ; italics: Ҷ ҷ) is a letter of the Cyrillic script. Its form is derived from the Cyrillic letter Che (Ч ч Ч ч). In the ISO 9 system of romanization, Che with descender is transliterated using the Latin letter C-cedilla (Ç ç).

Che with descender is used in the alphabets of the following languages:

In the Surgut dialect of the Khanty language and in the Tofa language, che with descender is sometimes used in place of che with hook, which has not yet been encoded in Unicode.

Computing codes

See also
Ç ç : Latin letter C with cedilla - an Albanian, Azerbaijani, Kurdish, Turkish, and Turkmen letter
Cyrillic characters in Unicode

References

Cyrillic letters with diacritics
Letters with descender (diacritic)